Karlsøya is an island in the municipality of Sarpsborg, in Østfold county, Norway. Before 1992, Karlsøya was a part of Skjeberg municipality. The island's only connection with the mainland is a bridge that connects the island with the peninsula of Ullerøy.

Sarpsborg